Pixel Gun 3D is a first-person shooter video game released in 2013 for iOS and Android. It was developed by American studio Lightmap and published by Cyprus studio Cubic Games, with both being acquired by Nexters in January 2022. According to Cubic Games, the game had surpassed 100 million downloads by that time.

Gameplay
Pixel Gun 3D is a first-person shooter and battle royale game that has over 69 maps and 1,000 different types of weapons. It has two game modes: a single-player campaign mode where players have to kill monsters such as ghouls and zombies, eventually having to fight bosses; and a multiplayer mode that has players competing in a map to reach a set amount of kills. Multiplayer "Deathmatches" involve individual players fighting each other while "Team Fights" involve two teams. In-game equipment can be purchased with coins earned from multiplayer battles. Players can join clans, obtain pets, customize their character and have different skins. The game's mechanics and graphics are similar to that of Minecraft.

Reception

Pixel Gun 3D has been lauded for its variety in features such as weapons, character customizability and game modes. Felipe Vinha of Brazilian website TechTudo thought it to be enjoyable, and Alex Avard of GamesRadar+ considered the game to have "a rambunctious moment-to-moment overload of sensory action and loaded visual flavour". The game was listed by Gamezebo's Mark Langshaw and Avard in 2018 and 2019 respectively as one of the best mobile battle royale games. Pocket Gamer ranked Pixel Gun 3D in 2021 as the 24th best shooter game for Android devices, and in 2022 as the 15th best for iOS.

While praising the game's multiplayer mode, Mike Deneen of 148Apps found the single-player mode to be frustrating and uninteresting. Vinha criticized what he saw as annoying bugs and advertisements.

References

External links
 

2013 video games
IOS games
Android (operating system) games
Windows Phone games
First-person shooters
Multiplayer and single-player video games
Video games developed in Russia
Video games developed in the United States
Slender Man